Alberto Martín was the defending champion, but he lost to Antonio Veić in the second round.
Daniel Gimeno-Traver won in the final 6–4, 6–0, against Paolo Lorenzi.

Seeds

Draw

Final four

Top half

Bottom half

References
 Main Draw
 Qualifying Draw

Open Tarragona Costa Daurada - Singles
Open Tarragona Costa Daurada